Pierre Hache, known by his stage names Keehdi Mizrahi and Kiddy Smile, is a French DJ, dancer, television personality, and actor.

Career 
In March 2022, he was announced as a regular panelist of the upcoming series Drag Race France.

Filmography

Film
 Climax - Daddy

Television
 Drag Race France - Himself (regular judge)

References

Year of birth missing (living people)
Living people
Drag Race France
French DJs
French LGBT musicians
Place of birth missing (living people)